HBL may refer to:

 HBL F.C., a Pakistani football club
 HBL Pakistan, a Pakistani bank
 Habib Bank Limited cricket team, a Pakistani cricket team
 Handball-Bundesliga, a professional handball league in Germany
 Himalayan Bank Limited, a Nepalese bank
Homer D. Babbidge Library, an American academic library
 Hufvudstadsbladet, a Swedish-language newspaper in Finland